Tosen Chapel or Lande Chapel is a parish church of the Church of Norway in Brønnøy Municipality in Nordland county, Norway. It is located in the village of Lande. It is one of the churches for the Velfjord og Tosen parish which is part of the Sør-Helgeland prosti (deanery) in the Diocese of Sør-Hålogaland. The white, wooden church was built in a long church style in 1888. The church seats about 80 people.

History
The church was originally constructed in 1734 at Solstad (near Holm) in Bindal and it was known then as Solstad Church. The building was disassembled and moved here in 1888 when it was renamed as Tosen Chapel.

See also
List of churches in Sør-Hålogaland

References

Brønnøy
Churches in Nordland
Wooden churches in Norway
19th-century Church of Norway church buildings
Churches completed in 1888
1888 establishments in Norway
Long churches in Norway